The 1973 Milan–San Remo was the 64th edition of the Milan–San Remo cycle race and was held on 19 March 1973. The race started in Milan and finished in San Remo. The race was won by Roger De Vlaeminck of the Brooklyn team.

General classification

References

Further reading
 

1973
1973 in road cycling
1973 in Italian sport
1973 Super Prestige Pernod